Conophytum bilobum is a plant in the family Aizoaceae, native to southern South Africa. It blooms in autumn. The specific epithet bilobum comes from the two-lobed bodies these plants possess.

Subspecies
Currently accepted subspecies include:

Conophytum bilobum subsp. altum (L.Bolus) S.A.Hammer
Conophytum bilobum subsp. claviferens S.A.Hammer
Conophytum bilobum subsp. gracilistylum (L.Bolus) S.A.Hammer

References 

Hassler, M. 2018. Conophytum bilobum World Plants: Synonymic Checklists of the Vascular Plants of the World (version Mar. 2018). In: Roskov Y., Abucay L., Orrell T., Nicolson D., Bailly N., Kirk P., Bourgoin T., DeWalt R.E., Decock W., De Wever A., Nieukerken E. van, Zarucchi J., Penev L., eds. 2018. Species 2000 & ITIS Catalogue of Life. Published on the internet. Accessed: 2018 Jul. 04.
USDA, ARS, Germplasm Resources Information Network. Conophytum bilobum in the Germplasm Resources Information Network (GRIN), U.S. Department of Agriculture Agricultural Research Service. Accessed on 09-Oct-10.

bilobum
Endemic flora of South Africa
Flora of the Cape Provinces
Taxa named by N. E. Brown
Taxa named by Rudolf Marloth